Dr. David Livingstone, exploring the interior of Africa, arrived at Lake Ngami in present-day Botswana on 3 August 1849.

Births
Mapondera, militant, is born into the Rozvi Negomo dynasty

See also
other events of 1840s
1850s in Zimbabwe and 
Years in Zimbabwe

Decades in Zimbabwe
Zimbabwe